Friedrich Salomon Krauss (7 October 1859, Požega, Kingdom of Hungary – 29 May 1938, Vienna, Austria) was a Croatian Austrian Jewish sexologist, ethnographer, folklorist, and Slavist.

Education
In 1877–78, Krauss attended the University of Vienna.

Career
One of his first publications was a translation of Artemidoros' of Daldis Interpretation of Dreams, which was cited in Sigmund Freud's book The Interpretation of Dreams. He began his career as a folklorist and ethnologist.

In 1884–85, Krauss received funding from the Crown Prince Rudolf to gather folklore and ballads of the Guslar singers in Bosnia, Croatia and Herzegovina. As a result of this field research, he published a two-volume collection of fairytales, Sagen und Märchen der Südslaven.

Perhaps his most famous work was the Anthropophytia (1904–1913), a scholarly yearbook which published folklore of erotic and sexual content. In alliance with the growing psychoanalytic movement, Krauss and his colleagues felt that sexual folklore, which was generally purged from all published collections by scholars, could provide valuable information about a culture and society. He was a correspondent of Freud and used the term paraphilia to describe certain deviant sexual practices.

His research in the field of sexuality led to some conflict. In 1913 Anthropophytia was banned and Krauss was brought to trial in Berlin as a pornographer. He was convicted, which caused him a large financial loss and hurt his reputation.

Krauss lived and worked as a writer, private scholar, and translator in Vienna. His translations include  Rites of All Nations by John Gregory Bourke.

See also

 List of people from Vienna

References

Bibliography
 Raymond L. Burt: F. S. Krauss (1859–1938): Selbstzeugnisse und Materialien zur Bibliographie des Volkskundlers, Literaten und Sexualforschers (1990) 
 Peter Horwath & Miroljub Jokovic: "Friedrich Salomo Krauss (1859–1938)" (Novi Sad 1992) 
 Krauss, Friedrich Salomo: "Volkserzählungen der Südslaven: Märchen und Sagen, Schwänke, Schnurren und erbauliche Geschichten" Burt, Raymond L. (Hrsg.); Puchner, Walter (Hrsg.) Wien 2002  
 Wolfgang Jacobeit u.a. (Hg.): Völkische Wissenschaft. Gestalten und Tendenzen der deutschen und österreichischen Volkskunde in der ersten Hälfte des 20. Jahrhunderts. (Wien 1984)

External links
 
 

1859 births
1938 deaths
19th-century Austrian writers
19th-century Hungarian male writers
19th-century scholars
19th-century translators
20th-century Austrian writers
20th-century Hungarian male writers
20th-century scholars
20th-century translators
Austrian ethnographers
Austrian people of Croatian-Jewish descent
Austrian sexologists
Austro-Hungarian Jews
Austro-Hungarian scientists
Croatian Austro-Hungarians
Croatian ethnographers
Croatian Jews
Croatian translators
Deaths in Austria
Folklorists
Hungarian social scientists
People from Požega, Croatia
Slavists
Austrian translators
University of Vienna alumni
Writers from Vienna
Hungarian translators